Pen Vilai Verum 999 Rubai Mattume is a 2022 Indian Tamil-language drama film directed by Varadaraj and starring Rajkamal and Swetha Pandit. It was released on 7 January 2022.

Cast

Production
The film initially had the title Penn Vilai Verum Roobai 999 (price of a girl is only 999 rupees), to which the Tamil Film Producers Council as well as the Producers Guild objected. It was later shortened to PV999, before it released under a longer name. Production for the film started in mid-2018.

Reception
The film was released on 7 January 2022 across Tamil Nadu. A critic from Maalai Malar gave the film a mixed review, noting it had a social message. A reviewer from Dinamalar rated it 2.25 out of 5, calling out the low production values. 

A critic from MyKollywood noted "the first half is interesting and keeps the audience on the edge of their seat. However, the story deviates from the core theme during the second half." NewsToday called the film "a movie with a message".

References

External links

2022 films
2022 drama films
Indian drama films
2020s Tamil-language films